The Institute of International and European Affairs (IIEA) is an Irish policy think tank focusing on European and international policy trends based in Dublin, Ireland. It is known for its seminars and speaking events which attract notable international figures.

History

The IIEA was founded as the Institute of European affairs in 1991. According to Tony Brown, author of a history of the IIEA, it was established to promote informed debate on European affairs in the wake of the Crotty Judgement and the subsequent Irish referendum on the Single European Act, which he argues was marked by low turnout for the time and limited and low-quality debate. The institute was officially launched in April 1991 by Minister for Foreign Affairs Gerry Collins. Brendan Halligan was head of the organising committee and its first chairman. Mary Robinson, then President of Ireland, was appointed as its patron.

A June 1996 Irish Times article notes that the Institute of European Affairs (IEA) was set up in 1989 by Brendan Halligan, the former General Secretary of the Irish Labour Party, and that much of the financial backing came from Irish semi–state bodies, including those on which Halligan was a board member. The article also notes that the IEA rented a house on 8 North Great George's Street of which Halligan was a part owner. Tony Brown writes that Brendan Halligan and founding member Niall Greene purchased 8 North Great Georges street with their own money in trust for the use of the institute with the option to purchase the premises at the lower of cost or market value when it had secured the funds to do so. The IIEA finally purchased the building in 1998, noting "a debt of gratitude to Brendan Halligan and Niall Greene" for this support in that year's Annual Report. Brigid Laffan also states that Halligan and Greene purchased the premises in trust for the IIEA.

The institute's research programme was initially led by Professor Patrick Keatinge of Trinity College Dublin who was the first senior staff appointee as Senior Research Fellow. In 1991 and 1992, the institute produced ten publications including on Economic and Monetary Union and Irish public opinion on Irish neutrality. Early authors included as James Dooge, Miriam Hederman O'Brien, Brigid Laffan and Trinity College Dublin Professor Michael Marsh.  Keatinge’s term was followed by Brian Farrell as the institute’s first Director General from 1994 to 1996.

Farrell was succeeded in 1996 by Terry Stewart, a former Director of the European Commission Representation in Dublin. Stewart held this position until 1999. 
The next Director General was Joe Brosnan, who held this position from 1999 to 2002. Brosnan was a former Secretary General of the Irish Department of Justice and had been Chef de Cabinet of Padraig Flynn in the European Commission.

The former leader of Fine Gael, Alan Dukes was appointed as the Director General of the IEA in December 2002. a post he held until December 2007.  In July 2007, the IEA changed its name to the Institute of International and European Affairs (IIEA), Jill Donohughe, previously Director of Research, was the first female Director General of the IIEA from 2008 to 2010.

Former Irish Ambassador to the UN Dáithí O'Ceallaigh was Director General of the IIEA from 2010 to 2013.  O'Ceallaigh had been Irish ambassador to the UN from 2007 to 2009 and was previously Irish ambassador to the United Kingdom (2001–2007).  In August 2013, Tom Arnold, previously CEO of Concern Worldwide, was appointed Director General of the IIEA.  In March 2017, Barry Andrews, former CEO of GOAL and Irish Minister of State for Children, was appointed Director General.  At the same time as the appointment of Barry Andews, Halligan, then 81 years of age, stepped down as Chairperson to become President of the IIEA. Ruairi Quinn, former leader of the Labour Party, became the new Chairperson of the IIEA.

In January 2019 Barry Andrews stepped down as Director General temporarily to run in the European Parliament election and resigned after his election as an MEP. He was succeeded as Acting Director General by Donal de Buitléir, Chairman of the Low Pay Commission. Michael Collins, previously Irish Ambassador to Germany, was appointed Director General in November 2019. In April 2022, David O'Sullivan, former Secretary-General of the European Commission, became the new Director General of the IIEA.

Activities

Research

The IIEA's public accounts state that the principal activity of the IIEA is to: "promote the research of International and European political, economic, cultural, societal and legal institutions, proceedings and relations". IIEA research is sometimes used in Oireachtas reports. IIEA research is often covered in the media. Recent coverage includes reviews by the Financial Times and the Irish Times of the IIEA book "Britain and Europe: The Endgame. An Irish Perspective", an interview with IIEA Chief Economist Dan O'Brien on Apple and state aid and coverage on research by Professor Frank Barry on the implications of a change in the US corporation tax system for Ireland.

Seminars

The IIEA was described by the Irish Times in 2007 as a "a policy research think-tank and forum", with the most notable activities of the IIEA being the quantum of speaking events on mostly European issues, hosted over the years.  In 2015, the IIEA hosted 120 seminars with speakers such as Jean Claude Trichet and Pierre Moscovici.  In 2014, the IIEA hosted 140 seminars with speakers such as Peter Sutherland and Martin Wolf.  In 2013, the year of Ireland's EU Presidency, the IIEA hosted 170 seminars with speakers such as Christine Lagarde.

Structure

Legal status

The IIEA's public accounts (Company Number 171807) state it is a company limited by guarantee which does not have share capital. The IIEA pays no taxes as it is an Irish Registered Charity (RCN 20024889).

Funding structure

, the IIEA's most recent filed accounts for the 2016 financial year state that the IIEA's Income of €1,120,714 million separates into four categories (see ):

CE–Scheme and grants are Irish State sourced (32% of IIEA income); however, it is believed a material portion of the Subscription (and potentially Other category), are sourced from the Irish State (either directly from State departments, or via State–owned companies), and thus over 50% of IIEA income is funded by the Irish exchequer.

Governance 

, the Director General and IIEA staff are overseen by  a Board of 17 Directors (in alphabetical order):

 Conor Brady
 John Bruton
 Brendan ButlerΔ
 Brian Cowen
 Pat Cox
 Marie Cross, former senior diplomat in the Irish Department of Foreign Affairs.
 Catherine Day
 David Gunning, former CEO of the Irish semi-state forestry company, Coillte.
 Patrick Honohan
 John Hume, founding partner of Hume Brophy, a public relations and communications company.
 Kevin Keary, a member of the Cabinet of Irish EU Trade Commissioner, Phil Hogan.
 Peter McLoone
 Terry Neill, retired Managing Partner of Andersen Consulting Ireland.
 Terence O'Rourke, retired Managing Partner of KPMG Ireland.
 Ruairi Quinn†
 John Redmond, Company Secretary of the Irish semi-state power company, the ESB.‡
 Frances P. Ruane

(†) Chairperson
(‡) Secretary
(Δ) Treasurer

Honorary positions 

, the IIEA also listed a number of Honorary Positions:

Patron Michael D. Higgins President of Ireland
President Brendan Halligan Founder of the IIEA
Vice Presidents: Adrian Burke, Tom Haughey, Una O’Dwyer, Nora Owen

Controversies

Brexit Hub

In January 2018, the Irish Times reported that the IIEA had asked the Department of Foreign Affairs in 2017 for €250,000 per annum to set up a new "Brexit Hub" office in Merrion Square to "act as a forum for sharing well-informed discussion on Brexit strategies". This request was declined on the basis of value for money. The proposed grant was to pay for new offices closer to Government Buildings and to also cover some of the €119,000 salary of the then Director General Barry Andrews, and a new Brexit Hub Director, Donal de Buitléir.

Accounts

IIEA published abridged accounts from 2009 to 2015 on their website.  The Irish Charities Regulator website holds copies of the full IIEA accounts that are filed with the Companies Registration Office ("CRO"), for 2014, 2015 and 2016, which contain additional detail, particularly around the CE–Scheme, and the IIEA offices at 8 North Great George's Street.

Selected books

See also

Economic and Social Research Institute, Ireland's main think tank on economics and social policy
Irish Fiscal Advisory Council, Irish independent statutory budgetary advisor
National Economic and Social Council, independent body that advises the Taoiseach on areas of policy relating to social and economic development

Notes

References

External links
 Irish Register of Lobbying Groups Institute of International and European Affairs
 Irish Charity Register Institute of International and European Affairs

 
Think tanks based in Ireland
European integration think tanks